Virdhi Chand Jain (1920-2010) was an Indian freedom fighter, parliamentarian and lawyer. He was a Member of Parliament for Barmer in Rajasthan and former Member of Legislative Assembly in Barmer constituency from Rajasthan.
He was a party member of Indian National Congress.

Personal
Late Shri Virdhi Chand Jain also known as Vridhi Chand Jain, son of Shri Rawat Mal Jain, was born on 4 July 1920 in a Bohra Jain family at Chohtan, Barmer, Rajasthan. A Commerce and Law graduate, studied at Sanatan Dharma College, Kanpur, Uttar Pradesh. He was married to Late Smt. Mooli Devi and has three sons, and 9 grandchildren. Late Shri Virdhi Chand Jain was Bohra - Jain by religion and was a member of the Indian National Congress (INC) party.

Member of Parliament

MLA/Member of Barmer assembly constituency

Social activities   
Fought for the cause of the downtrodden, oppressed and eradication of dacoit menace; pleaded the cause of agriculturists in eradicating "Begar" and Lag Bag and introducing "Baghori" (cash rent) in Barmer District of Rajasthan.

References

Lok Sabha members from Rajasthan
People from Barmer, Rajasthan
1920 births
India MPs 1980–1984
India MPs 1984–1989
Rajasthan MLAs 1972–1977
2010 deaths
20th-century Indian Jains
Rajasthan MLAs 1967–1972
Rajasthan MLAs 1977–1980
Indian National Congress politicians from Rajasthan